is a character in the manga series The Promised Neverland, created by Kaiu Shirai and Posuka Demizu. Norman is an 11-year-old boy living at Grace Field House. Like Ray and Emma, Norman consistently gets perfect scores on his daily exams. He is known for being a genius strategist and planner, as well as unbeatable at the game of tag. He discovers the truth of the orphanage with Emma and teams up with Ray to devise a plan to escape. While he knows leaving with every child in the house is near to impossible, his love for his sister Emma pushes him to continue trying.

Creation

According to Kaiu Shirai, Norman is the mainstay of the group and had a "lighter" mood compare to Ray and Emma. For his character design, Shirai asked for something like angelic, and a bit ethereal, with a simple design philosophy. Making him look like a moon or a knight of the story.

Posuka Demizu had difficulties creating the character design of Norman, including his body type, face and hair. According to Demizu, Norman was supposed to be slender in his original design, but it was difficult to show the difference between him and the other children. All of them wear the same clothes. So she decided to maintain the current design.

Casting
In the anime adaptation, the character is voiced by Maaya Uchida in Japanese; and Jeannie Tirado voices the character in English. In the live-action film adaptation, Norman was portrayed by Rihito Itagaki.

Appearances

In The Promised Neverland
Norman was born on March 21, 2034. At the beginning of the story on October 12, 2045, Norman is 11-year-old boy living at Grace Field House orphanage. He has blue eyes and short white hair that is parted to his left, with a longer piece curving upwards on the left side of his head. An authentication number, 22194 is tattooed on his neck. As the most intelligent out of the three, he is the first to find out Ray's true identity as Isabella's spy and prepare various back-up plans and escape routes. After Ray is betrayed by Isabella, Norman is forced to be shipped before his 12th birthday, accepting his fate of inevitable death to deceive her and let the rest of the children escape.

However, instead of being put down, Norman is sent to a special research facility called Lambda Λ7214, it was created in order to try to create higher quality human livestock in a faster and more efficient way than the Premium Farms for the tifarti ceremony. He escapes from Lambda and destroys the place after leading the other children held there in an uprising. Afterwards, he establishes a place called The Paradise Hideout for children they rescued from Lambda to live at and prepares a plan to wipe out all demons.

Appearances in other media
Norman appeared in two drama CDs released along with the anime series' first season Blu-ray disc, titled GF House Ghost Disturbance and Gift from the 39th Girl. The stories were originated from the novel A Letter from Norman. Norman also appeared in two other drama CDs titled The day Emma cried and Voice Time Capsule, released along with the anime series' second season Blu-ray disc.

Good Smile Company launched a Nendoroid figure based on the character from the series in June 2021. Norman is a playable character in the mobile game The Promised Neverland: Escape the Hunting Grounds released on iOS and Android. Norman is also a playable character in the crossover collaborations between The Promised Neverland and the smartphone video games Identity V, Jumputi Heroes, Dragon Egg, Vivid Army and LINE POP 2.

Reception

Popularity
Norman was nominated to the Best Male Character category at the 41st Anime Grand Prix in 2019. He was also nominated for the Man of the Year category in the 6th Anime Trending Awards in 2020. Norman ranked at the 1st place in the Color Illustration Character Poll of the series in 2018. In the popularity poll of the series in 2018, Norman is in the 2nd place. He also took the second place in the 2nd popularity poll of the series, with a total of 4763 votes.

Critical response
Brittany Vincent from Syfy praised the character and describes him as "Norman looks fragile but has a calm demeanor and quiet strength about him". Pauline Croquet from the french newspaper Le Monde said that the design of the three main characters, including Norman, is very original and comes out of the shōnen manga typical designs.

See also

 List of The Promised Neverland characters

References

External links
  
  

Comics characters introduced in 2016
Male characters in anime and manga
Fictional orphans
Orphan characters in anime and manga
Child characters in anime and manga
Fantasy anime and manga characters